The  WoodSongs Old-Time Radio Hour is a radio program created, produced, and hosted by folksinger Michael Johnathon.

Background 
WoodSongs Old-Time Radio Hour is a live audience celebration of grassroots music and the artists who make it. The show airs on 537 radio stations from Australia to Boston then to Dublin, Ireland, on American Forces Radio Network twice each weekend in 177 nations, every military base and US Naval ship in the world. WoodSongs is produced 44 Mondays a year.

The WoodSongs Old-Time Radio Hour is an all-volunteer-run non-profit organization, and is a worldwide multimedia celebration of grassroots music filmed in front of live audience.  WoodSongs is not a concert, but a one-hour musical conversation focusing on the artists and their music. The WoodSongs Old-Time Radio Hour began in 1998 in a small studio that had a sitting place for only 20 people.  It was recorded on a cassette tape that had to be turned over halfway through the broadcast, and was picked up by one radio station, WRVG in Georgetown, Kentucky. In 1999 WoodSongs moved to a 150-seat room at the Lexington Public Library.  After selling out 50 shows in a row, the broadcast was moved in 2000 to the Kentucky Theatre where it stayed until January 2013 when it moved to the 540 seat Lyric Theatre & Cultural Arts Center.  By 2005 WoodSongs was being aired on 320 radio stations, and by 2013, 509 radio stations across North America and Internationally.

Radio broadcast 
The radio program is available to both noncommercial and commercial radio stations, one of the few widely distributed radio programs in the United States to be offered to both types of stations.  This does not include the addition of the American Forces Network which broadcasts it in 173 nations, to over 1 million listeners worldwide, and every US Naval ship at sea.  In Kentucky, KET (Kentucky Educational Television) (PBS) public television airs the show several times a week. It is distributed to public television stations by the National Educational Telecommunications Association. Commercial cable/satellite network RFD-TV also carries the series. The WoodSongs Old-Time Radio Hour produces 1 show a week for 44 weeks every Monday evening at the Lyric Theatre in Lexington, Kentucky, and has produced over 750 broadcasts that have aired worldwide.

Partnerships 
The WoodSongs Old-Time Radio Hour occasionally takes the show on the road and in 2013 WoodSongs partnered with Alltech, Kentucky Tourism, Lexington Tourism, and Tourism Ireland to bring WoodSongs to Dublin, Ireland, for a double broadcast event attended by 2,000 fans at the Dublin Convention Center.  The Ireland broadcast celebrated Kentucky bluegrass as presented by Irish bluegrass artists.  This broadcast was also presented as a special broadcast on DISH TV Network.  This added 14 million USA television homes to the public broadcast of this show.  Show #728 featuring Tommy Emmanuel was also featured on the DISH TV Network.  Also in 2013, the WoodSongs broadcast was taken to Eureka Springs, Arkansas, to celebrate the music of the Ozarks.  Almost 1,000 fans sold out the historic Auditorium as Ozark musicians of many cultural backgrounds presented their music on a national broadcast.

Community involvement 
Everyone associated with the WoodSongs Old-Time Radio Hour is a volunteer including Michael Johnathon, and all the artists come on the broadcasts for free.  WoodSongs involves the community in many ways.  In the Central Kentucky community, they involve regional schools and universities for the WoodSongs student intern program for the purpose of engaging students to participate in the weekly productions and have hands on experience in setting up a national broadcast stage.  WoodSongs also has ongoing relationships and works closely with music teachers, private instructors, local arts groups (such as LAMA and LexArts), as well as independent artists who add local performance flavor in the lobby of the Lyric Theatre each night of the WoodSongs broadcast.  WoodSongs has a long history of spotlighting and featuring Kentucky and Appalachian artists.  They have presented well over 300 different Kentucky artists on a worldwide level including J.D. Crowe, Ben Sollee, Homer Ledford, Dale Ann Bradley, EXILE, The McLain Family Band, and many more.  The broadcast stage is open to artists of all genres, from all regions, all economic and ethnic backgrounds.  Selection is never based on label affiliation, marketing, sexual, or economic perimeters.  As stated on the broadcast, "You don't have to be famous to be on WoodSongs, you just have to be very good."

Michael Johnathon started the WoodSongs CoffeeHouse Association which has over 90 concert stages nationwide.  The purpose of the WoodSongs CoffeeHouse is to encourage local participation by regional musicians and artists, and to give them a platform to express themselves and surround themselves with the music community.

Johnathon also created the WoodSongs Front Porch Association (501-c-3) The members are called SONGFARMERS, with over 56 community chapters from Hawaii to Florida, Arkansas to Vermont. A TV documentary about the community driven project aired on the RFD-TV Network.

All but some of the oldest shows are archived on the WoodSongs website and can be watched for free.  The University of Kentucky is the host of the global WoodSongs archive.  This archive is administered by Professor Ron Pen at the John Jacob Niles Center for American Music.

DZWR also streams archived episodes of this program every Saturday night.

References

External links 
 Watch the 30 minute PBS documentary.
 WoodSongs Old-Time Radio Hour official website
 Michael's Woodsongs Blog Michael Johnathon reflects on the show and participants who have made it possible. 
 WoodSongs at the Public Radio Exchange

American music radio programs
Folk music mass media
Culture of Lexington, Kentucky